Harold Reynolds (born 1960), baseball player.

Harold Reynolds may also refer to:

Harold Reynolds (cyclist), British Olympic cyclist
Harold Reynolds, protagonist of Harold (film)

See also
Harry Reynolds (disambiguation)